Bumbu  is a municipality (commune) in the Funa district of Kinshasa, the capital city of the Democratic Republic of the Congo.

The town is in the hilled southern portion of Kinshasa and settlement there is relatively new. It lies in the vicinity of the Kasa-Vubu and Kalamu boulevards.

Demographics

References

See also

Communes of Kinshasa
Funa District